Zeubach is a river of Bavaria, Germany.  It is a left tributary of the Wiesent in Waischenfeld.

See also
List of rivers of Bavaria

Rivers of Bavaria
Rivers of Germany